Idle Thumbs is a video game culture website and podcast network founded in 2004.

It features a weekly video game podcast of the same name hosted by former and current video game journalists and developers Chris Remo (Campo Santo, formerly Double Fine Productions), Nick Breckon (Telltale Games), Jake Rodkin and Sean Vanaman (Campo Santo, formerly Telltale Games), and James Spafford (Double Fine Productions, formerly Media Molecule).

Other podcasts hosted by the site include Three Moves Ahead, a strategy game podcast hosted by Troy Goodfellow and Rob Zacny; the Idle Book Club, discussing a selection of modern and classic literature; Terminal7, a Netrunner podcast hosted by Nels Anderson and Jesse Turner; Tone Control, where former "Thumb" regular Steve Gaynor interviews notable video game developers; Idle Weekend, a sister podcast to Idle Thumbs hosted by Danielle Riendeau and Rob Zacny; Important if True where hosts Chris Remo, Jake Rodkin, and Nick Breckon discuss a variety of societal oddities; Something True, a historical podcast about strange stories hosted by Alex Ashby and Duncan Fyfe; DOTA Today, about the trials and travails of Lords Management while playing Dota 2; and Every Game in This City, a podcast about playing well together in different cities around the world. The network has also launched a series of television viewing podcasts such as Twin Peaks Rewatch, The End of Mad Men, and True Detective Weekly.

The current run of the Idle Thumbs podcast and related announcements were the result of a successful Kickstarter crowdfunding campaign that concluded in March 2012. The campaign reached its $30,000 goal within two hours and concluded with a funding total of $136,924.

History
The site was an outlet for game news and op-ed pieces from 2004 until a hiatus in 2007. Three former staff writers, Chris Remo (then-Editor at Large for Gamasutra), Nick Breckon (then of Shacknews), and Jake Rodkin (then of Telltale Games), revived the site as a podcast in late 2008. The show was unstructured in format, with each host discussing recent games played and musing about game design. They were frequently joined by Steve Gaynor (then of 2K Marin) who would replace Nick Breckon after the latter's move to Bethesda Softworks. This second incarnation of the podcast also often featured Sean Vanaman of Telltale Games, who eventually became a core member. The podcast officially ended in mid-2010 after Remo took a job at Boston-based Irrational Games, with the show's then-final episode recorded live at the 2010 Penny Arcade Expo.

Kickstarter campaign
In February 2012—following Remo's return to San Francisco—Remo, Rodkin, and Vanaman started a Kickstarter crowdfunding campaign to raise $30,000 to revive the podcast in a more stable manner. They collaborated with Blendo Games to develop the sequel to Gravity Bone entitled Thirty Flights of Loving, which would be offered as a reward to backers. Remo composed the game's original soundtrack. The campaign met its goal within two hours and tripled it by the end of the first week. It ultimately raised $136,924, over four times the requested amount. At the time of its conclusion, it was the third-highest-earning video game project on Kickstarter.

Podcast relaunch and network
Shortly before the conclusion of the campaign, Troy Goodfellow of Three Moves Ahead podcast announced a partnership with Idle Thumbs, allowing the latter to host their content and forums. The same month, Idle Thumbs announced it would be launching its own monthly book club podcast featuring Remo, Rodkin, and Vanaman. The first selection was The Sense of an Ending by British author Julian Barnes. The flagship weekly Idle Thumbs podcast returned alongside a new temporary front page design on July 19, 2012, with the episode "The Dance of the Treasure Goblin."

Peter Molydeux Game Jam
In March 2012, Idle Thumbs helped organize a game jam called "What Would Molydeux?", with Anna Kipnis of Double Fine Productions and Patrick Klepek of Giant Bomb. The theme of the game jam is to create games based on ideas of the Twitter account @petermolydeux, a parody of Peter Molyneux. The initial San Francisco event inspired over 30 other local events across the world, including one in Brighton, UK which was attended by Molyneux. The events attracted over 900 participants and produced 280 games over two days.

Dishonored Return of Nick Breckon
In March 2013, Breckon returned to San Francisco to take a writing position at Telltale Games and resumed his hosting duties with Idle Thumbs. Shortly thereafter, Idle Thumbs celebrated its 100th podcast, in which Rodkin discovered that he was the only host to appear in every episode. Vanaman and Breckon also founded a new podcast in May dedicated to discussing the intricacies of DOTA 2 and Lords Management.

Lineup

Shows

References

External links
 

Video game podcasts
Video game websites
Podcasting companies